Arıkaya is a village in the Kozluk District of Batman Province in Turkey. The village had a population of 376 in 2021.

The hamlets of Dikbayır, Gökbudak, Irmak and Yemişlik are attached to the village.

References 

Villages in Kozluk District
Kurdish settlements in Batman Province